This is a list of buildings at the University of Southern Maine.

Gorham Campus

Portland Campus

Lewiston Campus

See also
Gorham Campus Historic District

References

 
Southern Maine
University of Southern Maine